Human height or stature is the distance from the bottom of the feet to the top of the head in a human body, standing erect. It is measured using a stadiometer, in centimetres when using the metric system or SI system, or feet and inches when using United States customary units or the imperial system.

In the early phase of anthropometric research history, questions about height techniques for measuring nutritional status often concerned genetic differences.

Height is also important because it is closely correlated with other health components, such as life expectancy. Studies show that there is a correlation between small stature and a longer life expectancy. Individuals of small stature are also more likely to have lower blood pressure and are less likely to acquire cancer. The University of Hawaii has found that the "longevity gene" FOXO3 that reduces the effects of aging is more commonly found in individuals of small body size. Short stature decreases the risk of venous insufficiency.

When populations share genetic backgrounds and environmental factors, average height is frequently characteristic within the group. Exceptional height variation (around 20% deviation from average) within such a population is sometimes due to gigantism or dwarfism, which are medical conditions caused by specific genes or endocrine abnormalities.

The development of human height can serve as an indicator of two key welfare components, namely nutritional quality and health. In regions of poverty or warfare, environmental factors like chronic malnutrition during childhood or adolescence may result in delayed growth and/or marked reductions in adult stature even without the presence of any of these medical conditions.

A study of 20th-century British natality trends indicated that while tall men tended to reproduce more than short men, women of below-average height had more children than taller women.

Determinants of growth and height 

The study of height is known as auxology. Growth has long been recognized as a measure of the health of individuals, hence part of the reasoning for the use of growth charts. For individuals, as indicators of health problems, growth trends are tracked for significant deviations, and growth is also monitored for significant deficiency from genetic expectations. Genetics is a major factor in determining the height of individuals, though it is far less influential regarding differences among populations. Average height is relevant to the measurement of the health and wellness (standard of living and quality of life) of populations.

Attributed as a significant reason for the trend of increasing height in parts of Europe are the egalitarian populations where proper medical care and adequate nutrition are relatively equally distributed. The uneven distribution of nutritional resources makes it more plausible for individuals with better access to resources to grow taller, while individuals with worse access to resources have a lessened chance of growing taller. Average height in a nation is correlated with protein quality. Nations that consume more protein in the form of meat, dairy, eggs, and fish tend to be taller, while those that obtain more protein from cereals tend to be shorter. Therefore, populations with high cattle per capita and high consumption of dairy live longer and are taller. Historically, this can be seen in the cases of the United States, Argentina, New Zealand and Australia in the beginning of the 19th century. Moreover, when the production and consumption of milk and beef is taken to consideration, it can be seen why the Germanic people who lived outside of the Roman Empire were taller than those who lived at its heart.

Changes in diet (nutrition) and a general rise in quality of health care and standard of living are the cited factors in the Asian populations. Malnutrition including chronic undernutrition and acute malnutrition is known to have caused stunted growth in various populations. This has been seen in North Korea, parts of Africa, certain historical Europe, and other populations. Developing countries such as Guatemala have rates of stunting in children under 5 living as high as 82.2% in Totonicapán, and 49.8% nationwide.

Height measurements are by nature subject to statistical sampling errors even for a single individual. In a clinical situation, height measurements are seldom taken more often than once per office visit, which may mean sampling taking place a week to several months apart. The smooth 50th percentile male and female growth curves illustrated above are aggregate values from thousands of individuals sampled at ages from birth to age 20. In reality, a single individual's growth curve shows large upward and downward spikes, partly due to actual differences in growth velocity, and partly due to small measurement errors.

For example, a typical measurement error of plus or minus  may completely nullify 0.5  cm of actual growth resulting in either a "negative" 0.5  cm growth (due to overestimation in the previous visit combined with underestimation in the latter), up to a  growth (the first visit underestimating and the second visit overestimating) in the same elapsed period between measurements. Note there is a discontinuity in the growth curves at age 2, which reflects the difference in recumbent length (with the child on his or her back), used in measuring infants and toddlers, and standing height typically measured from age 2 onwards.

Height, like other phenotypic traits, is determined by a combination of genetics and environmental factors. A child's height based on parental heights is subject to regression toward the mean, therefore extremely tall or short parents will likely have correspondingly taller or shorter offspring, but their offspring will also likely be closer to average height than the parents themselves. Genetic potential and several hormones, minus illness, is a basic determinant for height. Other factors include the genetic response to external factors such as diet, exercise, environment, and life circumstances.

Humans grow fastest (other than in the womb) as infants and toddlers, rapidly declining from a maximum at birth to roughly age 2, tapering to a slowly declining rate, and then, during the pubertal growth spurt (with an average girl starting her puberty and pubertal growth spurt at 10 years and an average boy starting his puberty and pubertal growth spurt at 12 years), a rapid rise to a second maximum (at around 11–12 years for an average female, and 13–14 years for an average male), followed by a steady decline to zero. The average female growth speed trails off to zero at about 15 or 16 years, whereas the average male curve continues for approximately 3 more years, going to zero at about 18–19. These are also critical periods where stressors such as malnutrition (or even severe child neglect) have the greatest effect.

Moreover, the health of a mother throughout her life, especially during her critical period and pregnancy, has a role. A healthier child and adult develops a body that is better able to provide optimal prenatal conditions. The pregnant mother's health is essential for herself but also the fetus as gestation is itself a critical period for an embryo/fetus, though some problems affecting height during this period are resolved by catch-up growth assuming childhood conditions are good. Thus, there is a cumulative generation effect such that nutrition and health over generations influence the height of descendants to vary degrees.

The age of the mother also has some influence on her child's height. Studies in modern times have observed a gradual increase in height with maternal age, though these early studies suggest that trend is due to various socio-economic situations that select certain demographics as being more likely to have a first birth early in the mother's life. These same studies show that children born to a young mother are more likely to have below-average educational and behavioural development, again suggesting an ultimate cause of resources and family status rather than a purely biological explanation.

It has been observed that first-born males are shorter than later-born males.
However, more recently the reverse observation was made. The study authors suggest that the cause may be socio-economic in nature.

Nature versus nurture 
The precise relationship between genetics and environment is complex and uncertain. Differences in human height is 60–80% heritable, according to several twin studies and has been considered polygenic since the Mendelian-biometrician debate a hundred years ago. A genome-wide association (GWA) study of more than 180,000 individuals has identified hundreds of genetic variants in at least 180 loci associated with adult human height. The number of individuals has since been expanded to 253,288 individuals and the number of genetic variants identified is 697 in 423 genetic loci. In a separate study of body proportion using sitting-height ratio, it reports that these 697 variants can be partitioned into 3 specific classes, (1) variants that primarily determine leg length, (2) variants that primarily determine spine and head length, or (3) variants that affect overall body size. This gives insights into the biological mechanisms underlying how these 697 genetic variants affect overall height. These loci do not only determine height, but other features or characteristics. As an example, 4 of the 7 loci identified for intracranial volume had previously been discovered for human height.

The effect of environment on height is illustrated by studies performed by anthropologist Barry Bogin and coworkers of Guatemala Mayan children living in the United States. In the early 1970s, when Bogin first visited Guatemala, he observed that Mayan Indian men averaged  in height and the women averaged . Bogin took another series of measurements after the Guatemalan Civil War, during which up to a million Guatemalans fled to the United States. He discovered that Maya refugees, who ranged from six to twelve years old, were significantly taller than their Guatemalan counterparts. By 2000, the American Maya were  taller than the Guatemalan Maya of the same age, largely due to better nutrition and health care. Bogin also noted that American Maya children had relatively longer legs, averaging  longer than the Guatemalan Maya (a significantly lower sitting height ratio).

The Nilotic peoples of Sudan such as the Shilluk and Dinka have been described as some of the tallest in the world. The Nilotic people are characterized as having long legs, narrow bodies and short trunks, an adaptation to hot weather. As the study points out, Nilotic people "may attain greater height if privileged with favourable environmental conditions during early childhood and adolescence, allowing full expression of the genetic material." Before fleeing, these refugees were subject to privation as a consequence of the succession of civil wars in their country from 1955 to the present.

They married in Shanghai, China, on 6 August 2007.

In Tibet, the Khampas are known for their great height.  Khampa males are on average .

Role of an individual's height

Height and health 

Studies show that there is a correlation between small stature and a longer life expectancy. Individuals of small stature are also more likely to have lower blood pressure and are less likely to acquire cancer. The University of Hawaii has found that the “longevity gene” FOXO3 that reduces the effects of aging is more commonly found in individuals of a small body size. Short stature decreases the risk of venous insufficiency. Certain studies have shown that height is a factor in overall health while some suggest tallness is associated with better cardiovascular health and shortness with longevity. Cancer risk has also been found to grow with height. Moreover, scientists have also observed a protective effect of height on risk for Alzheimer's disease, although this fact could be a result of the genetic overlap between height and intracraneal volume and there are also genetic variants influencing height that could affect biological mechanisms involved in Alzheimer's disease etiology, such as Insulin-like growth factor 1 (IGF-1).

Nonetheless, modern westernized interpretations of the relationship between height and health fail to account for the observed height variations worldwide.  Cavalli-Sforza and Cavalli-Sforza note that variations in height worldwide can be partly attributed to evolutionary pressures resulting from differing environments. These evolutionary pressures result in height-related health implications.  While tallness is an adaptive benefit in colder climates such as those found in Europe, shortness helps dissipate body heat in warmer climatic regions.  Consequently, the relationships between health and height cannot be easily generalized since tallness and shortness can both provide health benefits in different environmental settings.

In the end, being excessively tall can cause various medical problems, including cardiovascular problems, because of the increased load on the heart to supply the body with blood, and problems resulting from the increased time it takes the brain to communicate with the extremities. For example, Robert Wadlow, the tallest man known to verifiable history, developed trouble walking as his height increased throughout his life. In many of the pictures of the latter portion of his life, Wadlow can be seen gripping something for support. Late in his life, although he died at age 22, he had to wear braces on his legs and walk with a cane; and he died after developing an infection in his legs because he was unable to feel the irritation and cutting caused by his leg braces.

Sources are in disagreement about the overall relationship between height and longevity. Samaras and Elrick, in the Western Journal of Medicine, demonstrate an inverse correlation between height and longevity in several mammals including humans.

Women whose height is under  may have a small pelvis, resulting in such complications during childbirth as shoulder dystocia.

A study done in Sweden in 2005 has shown that there is a strong inverse correlation between height and suicide among Swedish men.

A large body of human and animal evidence indicates that shorter, smaller bodies age more slowly, and have fewer chronic diseases and greater longevity. For example, a study found eight areas of support for the "smaller lives longer" thesis. These areas of evidence include studies involving longevity, life expectancy, centenarians, male vs. female longevity differences, mortality advantages of shorter people, survival findings, smaller body size due to calorie restriction, and within-species body size differences. They all support the conclusion that smaller individuals live longer in healthy environments and with good nutrition. However, the difference in longevity is modest. Several human studies have found a loss of 0.5 years/centimeter of increased height (1.2 yr/inch). But these findings do not mean that all tall people die young. Many live to advanced ages and some become centenarians.

In medicine, height is measured to monitor child development, this is a better indicator of growth than weight in the long term.
For older people, excessive height loss is a symptom of osteoporosis. Height is also used to compute indicators like body surface area or body mass index.

Height and occupational success 

There is a large body of research in psychology, economics, and human biology that has assessed the relationship between several physical features (e.g., body height) and occupational success. The correlation between height and success was explored decades ago. Shorter people are considered to have an advantage in certain sports (e.g., gymnastics, race car driving, etc.), whereas in many other sports taller people have a major advantage. In most occupational fields, body height is not relevant to how well people are able to perform; nonetheless several studies found that success was positively correlated with body height, although there may be other factors such as gender or socioeconomic status that are correlated with height which may account for the difference in success.

A demonstration of the height-success association can be found in the realm of politics. In the United States presidential elections, the taller candidate won 22 out of 25 times in the 20th century. These examples, however, were all before modern forms of multi-media, i.e., television, which may further height discrimination in modern society. Further, growing evidence suggests that height may be a proxy for confidence, which is likewise strongly correlated with occupational success.

Sports

Human height throughout history 

In general, modern humans living in developed countries are taller than their ancient counterparts, but this was not always the case. Certain ancient human populations were quite tall, even surpassing the average height of the tallest of modern countries. For instance, hunter-gatherer populations living in India during the Mesolithic Era stood at an average height of around 183 cm (6'0) for males, and 172 cm (5'8) for females.

Human height worldwide sharply declined with the advent of the Neolithic revolution, likely due to significantly less protein consumption by agriculturalists as compared with hunter-gatherers.

During the Bronze Age, height varied significantly by region. The people of the Indus Valley Civilization were among the tallest in the world, with an average height of 175.8 cm (5' 9.5") for males, and 166.1 cm (5' 5") females.  The people of Ancient Egypt stood around 167.9 cm (5' 6") for males and 157.5 cm (5' 2") for females. 

The Ancient Greeks stood around 166.8 cm (5’5.5) for males and 154.5 cm (5’1) for females. The Romans were slightly taller, with an average height of 169.2 cm (5' 6.5") for males and 158 cm (5' 2") for females.

However, these increases appear to have largely levelled off. Before the mid-nineteenth century, there were cycles in height, with periods of increase and decrease; however, apart from the decline associated with the transition to agriculture, examinations of skeletons show no significant differences in height from the neolithic revolution through the early-1800s.

In general, there were no significant differences in regional height levels throughout the nineteenth century. The only exceptions of this rather uniform height distribution were people in the Anglo-Saxon settlement regions who were taller than the average and people from Southeast Asia with below-average heights. However, at the end of the nineteenth century and in the middle of the first globalization period, heights between rich and poor countries began to diverge. These differences did not disappear in the deglobalization period of the two World wars. Baten and Blum (2014)  find that in the nineteenth century, important determinants of height were the local availability of cattle, meat and milk as well as the local disease environment. In the late twentieth century, however, technologies and trade became more important, decreasing the impact of local availability of agricultural products.

In the eighteenth and nineteenth centuries, people of European descent in North America were far taller than those in Europe and were the tallest in the world. The original indigenous population of Plains Native Americans was also among the tallest populations of the world at the time.

Some studies also suggest that there existed the correlation between the height and the real wage, moreover, the correlation was higher among the less developed countries. The difference in height between children from different social classes was already observed by age two.

The average height of Americans and Europeans decreased during periods of rapid industrialization, possibly due to rapid population growth and broad decreases in economic status. This has become known as the early-industrial growth puzzle in the U.S. context the Antebellum Puzzle. In England during the early nineteenth century, the difference between the average height of English upper-class youth (students of Sandhurst Military Academy) and English working-class youth (Marine Society boys) reached , the highest that has been observed.

According to a study by J.W. Drukker and Vincent Tassenaar, the average height of a Dutch person decreased from 1830 to 1857, even while Dutch real GNP per capita was growing at an average rate of more than 0.5% per year. Urban mortality was also much higher than in rural regions.

A 2004 report citing a 2003 UNICEF study on the effects of malnutrition in North Korea, due to "successive famines," found young adult males to be significantly shorter. In contrast South Koreans "feasting on an increasingly Western-influenced diet," without famine, were growing taller. The height difference is minimal for Koreans over forty years old, who grew up at a time when economic conditions in the North were roughly comparable to those in the South, while height disparities are most acute for Koreans who grew up in the mid-1990s – a demographic in which South Koreans are about  taller than their North Korean counterparts – as this was a period during which the North was affected by a harsh famine where hundreds of thousands, if not millions, died of hunger. A study by South Korean anthropologists of North Korean children who had defected to China found that eighteen-year-old males were  shorter than South Koreans their age due to malnutrition.

The tallest woman in medical history was Trijntje Keever of Edam, Netherlands, who stood  when she died at the age of seventeen.

An image and stone tablet were found with the giants.

Adult height between populations often differs significantly. For example, the average height of women from the Czech Republic is greater than that of men from Malawi. This may be caused by genetic differences, childhood lifestyle differences (nutrition, sleep patterns, physical labor), or both.

Depending on sex, genetic and environmental factors, shrinkage of stature may begin in middle age in some individuals but tends to be universal in the extremely aged. This decrease in height is due to such factors as decreased height of inter-vertebral discs because of desiccation, atrophy of soft tissues, and postural changes secondary to degenerative disease.

Working on data of Indonesia, the study by Baten, Stegl and van der Eng suggests a positive relationship of economic development and average height. In Indonesia, human height has decreased coincidentally with natural or political shocks.

Average height around the world 

As with any statistical data, the accuracy of such data may be questionable for various reasons:
 Some studies may allow subjects to self-report values. Generally speaking, self-reported height tends to be taller than its measured height, although the overestimation of height depends on the reporting subject's height, age, gender and region.
 Test subjects may have been invited instead of chosen randomly, resulting in sampling bias.
 Some countries may have significant height gaps between different regions. For instance, one survey shows there is  gap between the tallest state and the shortest state in Germany. Under such circumstances, the mean height may not represent the total population unless sample subjects are appropriately taken from all regions with using weighted average of the different regional groups.
 Different social groups can show different mean height. According to a study in France, executives and professionals are  taller, and university students are  taller than the national average. As this case shows, data taken from a particular social group may not represent a total population in some countries.
 A relatively small sample of the population may have been measured, which makes it uncertain whether this sample accurately represents the entire population.
 The height of persons can vary over a day, due to factors such as a height increase from exercise done directly before measurement (normally inversely correlated), or a height increase since lying down for a significant period (normally inversely correlated). Such factors may not have been controlled in some of the studies.
 Men from Bosnia and Herzegovina, the Netherlands, Croatia, Serbia and Montenegro have the tallest average height.
 Dinka people are sometimes noted for their height. With the Tutsi of Rwanda, they are believed to be the tallest people in Africa. Other studies of comparative historical height data and nutrition place the Dinka as the tallest people in the world.

Measurement 

Crown-rump length is the measurement of the length of human embryos and fetuses from the top of the head (crown) to the bottom of the buttocks (rump). It is typically determined from ultrasound imagery and can be used to estimate gestational age.

Until two years old, recumbent length is used to measure infants. Length measures the same dimension as height, but height is measured standing up while the length is measured lying down.

Standing height is used to measure children over two years old and adults who can stand without assistance. Measure is done with a stadiometer. In general, standing height is about  less than recumbent length.

Surrogate height measurements are used when standing height and recumbent length are impractical. For sample Chumlea equation use knee height as indicator of stature. Other techniques include: arm span, sitting height, ulna length, etc.

See also 
 Anthropometry, the measurement of the human individual
 Human body weight
 List of tallest people
 Economics and Human Biology (academic journal)
 History of anthropometry
 Human physical appearance
 Human variability
 Pygmy peoples

Citations

General bibliography 
  (for heights in U.S. and Japan)
  (for heights in Germany)
 Netherlands Central Bureau for Statistics, 1996 (for average heights)
 
 
 
 A collection of data on human height, referred to here as "karube" but originally collected from other sources, is archived here. A copy is available here (an English translation of this Japanese page would make it easier to evaluate the quality of the data...)

Further reading

External links 

 CDC National Center for Health Statistics: Growth Charts of American Percentiles
 fao.org, Body Weights and Heights by Countries (given in percentiles)
 The Height Gap, Article discussing differences in height around the world
 Tallest in the World: Native Americans of the Great Plains in the Nineteenth Century
 European Heights in the Early eighteenth Century
 Spatial Convergence in Height in East-Central Europe, 1890–1910
 The Biological Standard of Living in Europe During the Last Two Millennia
 HEALTH AND NUTRITION IN THE PREINDUSTRIAL ERA: INSIGHTS FROM A MILLENNIUM OF AVERAGE HEIGHTS IN NORTHERN EUROPE
 Our World In Data – Human Height – Visualizations of how human height around the world has changed historically (by Max Roser). Charts for all countries, world maps, and links to more data sources.
 What Has Happened to the Quality of Life in the Advanced Industrialized Nations?
 A century of trends in adult human height, NCD Risk Factor Collaboration (NCD-RISC), DOI: 10.7554/eLife.13410, 25 July 2016

 
Height
Anthropometry
Auxology
Mathematics in medicine